Myopsyche fulvibasalis is a moth of the subfamily Arctiinae. It was described by George Hampson in 1918. It is found in Cameroon.

References

 

Endemic fauna of Cameroon
Arctiinae
Moths described in 1918